63 Moons Technologies Limited (stylised as 63 moons technologies), formerly Financial Technologies (India) Limited until 2016, is an Indian company which provides technology ventures, financial platforms and solutions for creating digital markets and marketplaces. It is headquartered in Mumbai, Maharashtra, and has its registered office in Chennai, Tamil Nadu. It was formed in 1988 and funded by Jignesh Shah. The company offers technology intellectual property to create and trade on financial markets. The company commenced operations with the development of technology products for connecting financial markets. It had its first IPO in 1995. The company introduced its first commodity derivatives trading platform, the Multi Commodity Exchange (MCX) in 2003. It established similar exchanges in India and elsewhere. FTIL has divested of its domestic and international ventures.

Operations

Atom Technologies
Atom Technologies Ltd. is one of India’s leading payments services providers started by the company, offering payment collection facilities over Internet, IVR, Mobile App and Point of Sale using credit, debit, net banking, cash cards and IMPS. FTIL divested a controlling stake to NTT Data Corporation in late 2018.

TickerPlant
TickerPlant is an analytics platform with real time streaming of market information on domestic and international exchanges as well as OTS markets. In the areas of commodities, forex and equity, TickerPlant provides IT-enabled services. The global financial content provider has also launched its own cryptocurrency super application called CryptoWire.

The company launched many domestic and international ventures. It owned several subsidiaries that included National Bulk Handling Corporation (NHBC), Multi Commodity Exchange (MCX), Dubai Gold & Commodities Exchange (DGCX), Indian Energy Exchange (IEX), MCX Stock Exchange (MCX-SX), DOME, Risk Solutions, Singapore Mercantile Exchange (SMX) and Bourse Africa. ODIN, the flagship product of the company, was used for trading in securities and commodities. In October, 2010, Financial Technologies (India) launched Global Board Of Trade (GBOT), an international multi–asset exchange in Mauritius. In February 2011, Financial Technologies launched Bahrain Financial Exchange (BFX), the first multi–asset exchange in the Middle East and North Africa.

Awards
The entity has won several awards, including the ‘Amity Corporate Excellence Award’, ‘IT People Award for Product Innovation’; ‘Exchange and Brokerage Products, Gurjar Ratna Award’, ‘Ernst & Young Entrepreneur of the Year 2006 Award for Business Transformation’, ‘DSCI Excellence Awards 2011’ in Security in IT Services – SME category, and ‘Golden Peacock HR Excellence Award’ for the year 2011. The company was also featured in the FinTech 100 Rankings 2011.

See also
List of stock exchanges
NSEL case

References

External links 
 

Financial services companies based in Mumbai
Financial services companies established in 1988
1988 establishments in Maharashtra
Indian companies established in 1988
Companies listed on the National Stock Exchange of India
Companies listed on the Bombay Stock Exchange